Dolly Gets Ahead is a 1930 German musical film directed by Anatole Litvak and starring Dolly Haas, Oskar Karlweis, and Grete Natzler. It was shot at the Babelsberg Studios in Berlin. The film's sets were designed by Heinz Fenschel and Jacek Rotmil.

Plot 
Boyish Dolly Klaren, who makes a living as a hat shop clerk, is an energetic tomboy. She would like to live out her full power as an artist and dreams of an acting career in the theater. She is close friends with the equally talented and unsuccessful musician Fred, who only laughs at Dolly when she tells him about her stage plans. With a trick, she can visit the local theater director Silbermann, who is in dire need: the leading role in a play has to be filled again because the previous star has ignominiously let him down. Silbermann, a compact, always a bit hectic and spirited theater man through and through, knows how PR works. Since he recognizes talent in Dolly, he vigorously beats the publicity drum and praises the completely unknown to the public with great Bohei.

In order to make the delicate girl a little more interesting for the audience, Silbermann also started the rumor that Dolly was the mistress of the noble Duke Eberhard von Schwarzenburg. Of course, he doesn't know anything about his happiness and is now beginning to develop an interest in the young girl. For this reason he attends the first performance of the new revue with Dolly, which turns out to be quite a failure for the debutante. The nobleman takes care of Dolly and tries to comfort her as much as possible. The man "in his prime" quickly falls in love with the girl, but has to rethink his attitude when he overhears a conversation about Dolly's (supposedly platonic) friend Fred. The duke withdraws in his calm, elegant manner. After various misunderstandings, not only do Dolly and Fred come together as a couple, but the lively theater novice also succeeds in turning the unsuccessful clarinettist into a sought-after hit composer who, thanks to Dolly's efforts, is soon able to land his first big hit.

Cast

References

Bibliography

External links 
 

1930 films
Films of the Weimar Republic
German musical films
1930 musical films
1930s German-language films
Films directed by Anatole Litvak
UFA GmbH films
German black-and-white films
1930 directorial debut films
1930s German films
Films shot at Babelsberg Studios